The Afghanistan cricket team toured the United Arab Emirates to play the United Arab Emirates cricket team in December 2016. The tour consisted of three Twenty20 International (T20I) matches. Afghanistan won the series 3–0.

Squads

T20I series

1st T20I

2nd T20I

3rd T20I

References

External links
 Series home at ESPN Cricinfo

2016 in Emirati cricket
2016 in Afghan cricket
International cricket competitions in 2016–17
Afghan cricket tours of the United Arab Emirates